Blaine High School, established in 1906, is located in Blaine,  Washington, United States, which is situated in the northwest corner of the state, adjacent to the Canada–US border. The school operates within the Blaine School District and serves approximately 639 students in grades 9-12. It is ranked 39th out of 539 high schools in the state.

Students have the opportunity to take Advanced Placement course work and exams. The AP participation rate at Blaine High School is 38%.

The student teacher ratio of 19:1 is equal to the state average. The 80% graduation rate is higher than the state average of 77%. The school's spending/student of $10,218 is higher than the state average of $8,997.

Mascot and colors
The school's colors are orange and black.  The school's mascot is the "Borderites", referring to the people of the community itself as Blaine sits directly on the British Columbia / Washington state border.

Notable alumni
 Bob Robertson - longtime Northwest play-by-play sportscaster
 Scott Gomez - ice hockey player
 Luke Ridnour - former professional basketball player
 Doug Goldsby - former CFL football player

References

External links
 Blaine High School
 Silver Medal School

High schools in Whatcom County, Washington
Public high schools in Washington (state)